Amale Dib (born June 19, 1993) is a French-Moroccan professional wrestler. She was most recently signed to WWE, where she performed for on the NXT UK under the mononymous ring name Amale. She was the first French female wrestler to be signed to WWE. She is best known for her time on the independent circuit, as well as the German-based professional wrestling promotion Westside Xtreme Wrestling (wXw), where she is a former Women's Champion.

Professional wrestling career

Independent circuit (2012–present) 
Amale debuted on January 7, 2012 for the French-based promotion Tigers Pro Wrestling. Since then, she has wrestled for multiple independent wrestling promotions.

Westside Xtreme Wrestling (2019–present) 

Amale is the current wXw Women's Champion in her first reign, having won the title on January 6, 2019. She defeated Killer Kelly, Toni Storm and Valkyrie at Superstars of Wrestling to win the title.

WWE (2020–2022) 
Prior to her signing with WWE, Amale wrestled on NXT UK several times, facing the likes of Aoife Valkyrie, Dani Luna, Jinny and Xia Brookside. These were in all losing efforts. On August 13, 2020, in a tweet, Amale announced that she had signed a contract with WWE. On October 8, 2020, she teamed with Nina Samuels against Luna and Brookside in a losing effort when Samuels abandoned Amale at ringside. Amale and Samuels argued later on that evening during Kay Lee Ray's state of union address. Two weeks later, she was defeated by Samuels. 
In May of 2021, Amale would start a short feud with Xia Brookside by attacking her on the May 6 episode of NXT UK costing her opportunity to compete in a gauntlet match to determine the next #1 contender for the NXT UK Women's championship. Amale would defeat Brookside two weeks later on the May 20 episode of NXT UK. Amale started a feud with NXT UK women's champion Meiko Satomura, where she accused Satomura of stealing her spot in the gauntlet match. She confronted Satomura after attacking Nina Samuels. Satomura accepted Amale's challenge. The next week she defeated Samuels. On the July 15 episode of NXT UK, Amale would unsuccessfully challenge Meiko Satomura for the NXT UK Women's Championship. After weeks of being off, she returned on the 15 September episode of NXT UK, where she defeated Myla Grace. She lost to Emillia McKenzie the following week.

She turned face in December after explaining her journey to WWE in a video. Upon her return in January, she started a feud with Jinny as she did not believe in her "French Hope". This resulted in a match between the two on the January 27 episode of NXT UK, with Jinny picking up the victory.
Amale rekindled her rivalry with Brookside by defeating her on the February 24 episode of NXT UK but lost to her on the March 31 episode due to interference from Brookside's new bodyguard, Eliza Alexander. After helping Angel Hayze from an attack by Xia Brookside and Eliza Alexander, she teamed with Hayze in a losing effort to Brookside and Alexander during NXT UK's 200th episode. Two weeks later she was defeated by Eliza Alexander. She defeated Stevie Turner on the 16 july episode of NXT UK. She defeated Nina Samuels the following week. She lost to Blair Davenport on an episode of NXT UK. She once again defeated Samuels. She took part in a fatal four way elimination match to determine the 1 contender to the NXT UK women's championship where she eliminated Isla Dawn, and was eliminated by Eliza Alexander. 

On 18 August 2022, Amale was released from her WWE contract.

Personal life 
Amale was a schoolteacher before she signed with WWE. She would teach her students during the week and wrestle on the weekends. Amale is of Moroccan descent.

Championships and accomplishments 
 Westside Xtreme Wrestling 
 wXw Women's Championship (1 time)

References 

1993 births
21st-century professional wrestlers
French female professional wrestlers
Moroccan female professional wrestlers
French people of Moroccan descent
French sportspeople of Moroccan descent
French schoolteachers
Living people